Visvanathar Temple is a Siva temple in Iravancheri in Nagapattinam district in Tamil Nadu (India).

Vaippu Sthalam
It is one of the shrines of the Vaippu Sthalams sung by Tamil Saivite Nayanar Appar.

Presiding deity
The presiding deity is known as Visvanathar. The Goddess is known as Visalakshi.

Location
This place is located in Tiruvarur-Kilvelur road, next to Neepaladi.

References

Hindu temples in Nagapattinam district
Shiva temples in Nagapattinam district